The Window is a 1991 Azerbaijani drama film directed by Hasan Abluj and Anvar Abluj.

Plot
The film reveals the contradictions between the "educator"-teachers and the "educated"-students in the boarding school, which is actually an orphanage, where lawlessness, violence, hypocrisy, and cruelty prevail. Little Ahsan (Ilham Babayev), forced to live in such contradictory conditions, but unable to adapt to these conditions, who misses his native home, finds the only way out - by throwing himself out of the window and perishes.

The film "Window" sounds like a warning, calling for a radical change in the educational system that cripples the fate of children.

Cast
Ilham Babayev — Ahsan
Valeh Karimov — Ahsa's father
Yashar Nuri — Nasib
Anwar Abluj — director
Ruslan Nasirov — Nomad
Simuzar Agakishiyeva — Narmina
Elkhan Bayramov — Savalan
Abbasgulu Abluj — Wasif
Zemfira Aliyeva — Sultannisa
Tavakkul Ismayilov — Burkhan
Khalil Ismayilov — Jeyhun
Mammadbagir Hasanov — Booty
Ramin Malikov — Rovshan
Hasan Abluj — Rovsha's father
Farid Hajiyev — Zaki
Nazir Aliyev is Zaki's father
Emil Bayramov — Sacrifice
Vusala Nabiyeva — Gumral
Rovshan Jahangirov — Samad
Abdul Mikayilov — Ahmed
Elkhan Guliyev - militia captain
Fikret Mammadov - militia lieutenant
Lalazar Mustafayeva - mother

See also
 Cinema of Azerbaijan
 Azerbaijani films from the 90s

References

1991 films
1991 drama films
Azerbaijani-language films